Uncensored is a 1942 British war drama film directed by Anthony Asquith starring Eric Portman, Phyllis Calvert and Griffith Jones. The film was produced at Gainsborough Pictures by Edward Black, with cinematography from Arthur Crabtree and screenplay by Rodney Ackland, Wolfgang Wilhelm and Terence Rattigan based on the 1937 novel of the same title by Oscar Millard. The film was shot at the company's Lime Grove Studios in Shepherd's Bush, with sets designed by the art director Alex Vetchinsky.

Uncensored is set in occupied Belgium and shares the propagandistic tone of many British films of its era.  While its reception was mainly positive, it was criticised in some quarters for its unrealistic portrayal of the occupying German forces as bungling, incompetent and easily outwitted buffoons.

On its original UK release Uncensored ran for 108 minutes; for overseas distribution however it was trimmed to 83 minutes and the cut version subsequently became more widely circulated.

Plot
Before the Nazi occupation of Belgium, Brussels nightclub owner André Delange (Portman) used to publish an anti-Nazi newspaper called La Libre Belgique (Free Belgium) which was distributed secretly.  In the aftermath of the German occupation, his underground colleagues in the Belgian resistance suggest reviving the newspaper, to which Delange agrees. With the help of his chief assistant Julie Lanvin (Calvert) and a small band of helpers, La Libre Belgique once more begins to circulate. When the Germans find out of its existence, they offer a reward to anyone who is prepared to identify those responsible for its publication.

Delange's business partner Charles Neels (Peter Glenville), disgruntled with their business relationship and jealous of Delange's relationship with the attractive Julie, betrays the whereabouts of the newspaper's makeshift office. The premises are raided and those present in the building arrested, but Delange and Julie manage to avoid capture.  The Germans announce to the populace that La Libre Belgique is no more and its perpetrators are in custody; however Delange and Julie succeed in printing and distributing another edition, making the Germans look foolish and leading them to assume that the information given to them by their informant was false. They release those arrested, who they now believe not to be the people they were looking for, and vow to continue searching for the real culprits.  Meanwhile the group led by Delange comes together again, and their work continues.

Cast

 Eric Portman as André Delange
 Phyllis Calvert as Julie Lanvin
 Griffith Jones as Father de Gruyte
 Raymond Lovell as von Koerner
 Peter Glenville as Charles Neels
 Irene Handl as Frau von Koerner
 Felix Aylmer as Col. von Hohenstein
 Eliot Makeham as Abbé de Moor

 John Slater as Théophile
 Aubrey Mallalieu as Louis Backer
 Frederick Culley as Victor Lanvin
 Carl Jaffe as Kohlmeier
 Walter Hudd as van Heemskirk
 J.H. Roberts as Father Corot
 Peter Godfrey as Lou
 Ben Williams as Arthur Backer

References

Bibliography
 Ryall, Tom. Anthony Asquith. Oxford University Press, 2013.

External links 
 
 
 

1942 films
1940s war films
British war films
Gainsborough Pictures films
British black-and-white films
World War II films made in wartime
Films based on British novels
Films shot at Lime Grove Studios
Films set in Belgium
Films directed by Anthony Asquith
Belgium in fiction
Films about the Belgian Resistance
Films with screenplays by Terence Rattigan
1940s English-language films
1940s British films